Leave No Trace is the second studio album by the American indie band Fool's Gold.  It was released on August 16, 2011 by IAMSOUND Records in the United States.

Reception

Leave No Trace received mixed to positive reviews from critics. The album holds a score of 66/100 based on 21 reviews, indicating "generally favorable reviews".

Spin gave "Leave No Trace" a score of 6/10. Critic Marc Hogan writes, "this Los Angeles quintet distilled a refreshing blend of African influences and Hebrew-language vocals on their 2009 self-titled debut...Though still sunny and hooky, 'Leave No Trace' lacks the enigmatic spark of its predecessor, especially now that the words are more readily understandable."

Track listing
All songs written by Luke Top & Lewis Pesacov.
 "The Dive"
 "Wild Window"
 "Street Clothes"
 "Leave No Trace"
 "Balmy"
 "Narrow Sun"
 "Tel Aviv"
 "Mammal"
 "Bark & Bite"
 "Lantern"

References

External links 
 Worlds End
 Pitchfork
 KCRW Preview
 NPR Preview

2011 albums
Fool's Gold (band) albums
Iamsound Records albums